The Salón Metropolitano (or simply Metropolitano) is a convention and exhibition facility inside the Alto Rosario Shopping in downtown Rosario, Argentina.

Located at 501 Junín Street, the 54,000-square-foot (5,000 m2) building offers six different rooms for concerts, meetings, banquets and classes. In 2007, the facility was expanded from 3,200 to 10,000 seating capacity for theatre and its total space was duplicated.

Rooms
The facility can be sub-divided into six new rooms.

Concerts
The following is a list of the most notable performances:
Ricky Martin – 6–7 March – 2 November 2016, on his One World Tour
Maluma – June 23 – December 9, 2016, on his Pretty Boy, Dirty Boy World Tour
Jesse & Joy – 18 September 2016
Lali – 6 October 2016, on her Soy Tour

References

Buildings and structures in Rosario, Santa Fe
Convention centres in Argentina